Arusiak Grigorian (born 11 April 1977) is an Armenian chess player with the title of Woman FIDE Master.

Career
Grigorian competed at the 31st Chess Olympiad for Armenia. She also played in the debut of Armenia at the European Team Chess Championship 1992.

References

External links
 
 
 
 
 Arusiak Grigorian at RedHotPawn.com

1977 births
Living people
Chess Woman FIDE Masters
Armenian female chess players
Chess Olympiad competitors